Burnand is a surname. Notable people include:

Aisling Burnand (born 1964), British businesswoman
Alphonse Burnand (1896–1981), American sailor
Eugène Burnand (1850–1921), Swiss painter and illustrator
F. C. Burnand (1836–1917), English comic writer and playwright
Geoffrey Burnand (1912–1997), English painter, theatrical designer and mural artist
Harry Burnand (1850–1919), English-born New Zealand engineer and sawmiller